Mary Beaumont Medd  (née Crowley, 4 August 1907 - 6 June  2005) was a British architect, known for public buildings including schools. Medd was the first architect to be employed by Hertfordshire county council.

Early life and education 
She was the daughter of Ralph Henry Crowley (1869–1953), who worked as Chief Medical Officer in the Ministry of Education. After education at home, she spent one year at an experimental school run by Isabel Fry, and then was at Bedales School from 1921 to 1926 where she became Head Girl.

After attending a finishing school in Switzerland, in 1927 she trained at the Architectural Association School of Architecture. She studied alongside Jessica Albery, Justin Blanco White, and Judith Ledeboer where they developed a commitment to housing reform and social concerns which impacted their future careers.

Career 
As Mary Crowley, working with Cecil George Kemp, she designed three houses at 102, 104 and 106 Orchard Road, Tewin, Hertfordshire, in 1935–36.

In 1941, John Newsom, Hertfordshire's education officer, hired her as the first architect to be employed by Hertfordshire County Council. She later met her husband David Leslie Medd (1917–2009), when she was part of the team of architects commissioned to build schools in Hertfordshire after World War II. They married on 11 April 1949, and always worked together after this, becoming leading school designers in England and Wales.

National Life Stories conducted an oral history interview (C467/29) with Mary Medd in 1998 for its Architects Lives' collection held by the British Library.

Mary Medd died on 6 June 2005 in Woolmer Green, Hertfordshire.

References

Further reading
 Campos Uribe, Alejandro, and Paula Lacomba Montes. “From Classrooms to Centres: Mary and David Medd’s Contribution to Postwar School Design in Britain.” Arq: Architectural Research Quarterly 24, no. 3 (January 1, 2020): 251–264.
 Shariff, Yasmin. “Schools Power: A New Biography of Mary Medd Is a Timely Reminder of the Interdependence of Architecture, Education and Children’s Welfare in the Modern Age.” Architects’ Journal 237, no. 12 (March 1, 2013): 63–67.
 University of York. Institute of Advanced Architectural Studies., and Mary Medd. A Right to Be Children: Designing for the Education of the Under-fives : An Account of Two Courses Held At the Institute of Advanced Architectural Studies, University of York, April and July 1974. London: RIBA Publications, 1976.

Gould, Jeremy (1977), Modern houses in Britain, 1919-1939, Society of Architectural Historians of Great Britain

1907 births
2005 deaths
20th-century English architects
British women architects
Architects from Bradford
People educated at Bedales School